20 Años is a 2012 original album by Peruvian singer Gian Marco. The disc won a Latin Grammy Award in the best singer songwriter category in 2012.

This CD was made to celebrate 20 years of artistic life. There are 20 songs, 18 of which are old but they were remastered with a change and two unreleased songs "Invisible" and "En Otra Vida". The song "Invisible" was composed by Gian Marco and Amaury Gutierrez.

For this album, Gian Marco received three nominations at the 13th Annual Latin Grammy Awards: Best Singer-Songwriter Album and Song of the Year (for "Invisible"). Gian Marco won the first category.

In 2013, he was nominated for the Premios Oye! in the categories Spanish Album of the Year, Song of the Year in Spanish (for "Invisible") and Male Solo Artist.

Singles
The video of the song 'Invisible' 'premiered in August starring the actress Mónica Sánchez.

Song List

Awards and nominations

Latin Grammy Award

Premios Oye!

References

2012 albums
Latin Grammy Award for Best Singer-Songwriter Album
Gian Marco albums